Age of the Wolf is a post-apocalyptic adventure series published in the British comics anthology 2000 AD. It was created by Alec Worley and Jon Davis-Hunt and first appeared in #1700 in 2010.

In the series, the ancient Norse prophecy of Ragnarök brings about a moonlit cataclysm in which most of humanity become werewolves. The plot charts the life of one of the few surviving humans, a dog pound worker called Rowan Morrigan who becomes a deadly werewolf hunter.

The series is a trilogy. The second and third entries shift the story forward years at a time. In the final part, 35 years have passed since the beginning and Rowan is a mother in her mid-fifties.

Creation and concept 
The series was originally conceived as a trilogy following a progression derived from the Three Fates of Norse mythology in which the heroine is first a type of sacrificial maiden, second a “Sarah Conner-type mother” and, finally, a monster. Worley envisioned the third part as a “reverse-Beowulf” in which Rowan, formerly the protagonist, would be the antagonist to a werewolf warrior. It was feared the third part would over-complicate the story so the original idea was abandoned. Worley adapted his original plan for the third part into a different vision of a world now adapted to long-term moonlight, with “a far-out pulp sci-fi feel, like something off a prog rock album, a Rodney Matthews poster or an '80s fantasy epic like The Dark Crystal, all funky vegetation, and alien creatures running around looking awesome.”

Publication history 
 Age of the Wolf, in 2000 AD #1700-08, Sept. 2010.
 Age of the Wolf: She Is Legend, in 2000 AD #1772-81, Feb. 2012.
 Age of the World: Wolfworld, in 2000 AD #1840-49, Jul. 2013

Collected edition 
 Age of the Wolf (Oct. 2014) Oxford: Rebellion

External links 
 The 2000 AD ABC #4: Age of the Wolf  at YouTube

References 

2000 AD comic strips
Comics characters introduced in 2010
2010 comics debuts
Fantasy comics
Post-apocalyptic comics
Werewolf comics
Norse mythology in comics
Works based on European myths and legends